The Battle of Vigo Bay is a 1702 oil on canvas painting by the Dutch artist Ludolf Bakhuizen. It depicts the Battle of Vigo Bay fought by Anglo-Dutch and Franco-Spanish forces.

1702 paintings
Naval war paintings